Thread may refer to:

Objects
 Thread (yarn), a kind of thin yarn used for sewing
 Thread (unit of measurement), a cotton yarn measure
 Screw thread, a helical ridge on a cylindrical fastener

Arts and entertainment
 Thread (film), 2016 Greek film
 Threads (1932 film), a film directed by G. B. Samuelson
 Threads (1984 film), a 1984 BBC television movie about a nuclear attack
 Threads (2017 film), a Norwegian-Canadian animated short film
 "Threads" (Stargate SG-1), a 2005 Stargate SG-1 episode
 "Thread", a poem by Patti Smith from Babel
 Thread, a lethal spore in the Dragonriders of Pern universe
 Phantom Thread, 2017 American historical drama film
 Project Runway: Threads, a Project Runway spin-off with child contestants

Music
 Threads (Battlefield Band album), 1995
 Threads (David S. Ware album), 2003
 Threads (Now, Now album), 2012
 Threads (Temposhark album), 2010
 Threads (Sheryl Crow album), 2019
 "Threads" (song), by This Will Destroy You from their 2008 self-titled album
 Thread, a 1999 album by Wideawake
 Thread (Red Sun Rising album), 2018
 Threads (EP), a 2015 extended play by Sarah Harding
 "Threads" (Sarah Harding song), 2015
 Threads, a 2021 album by the Verve Pipe

Computing
 Thread (computing), a sequence of instructions that may execute in parallel with others
 Conversation threading, a group of messages on a single topic posted to a newsgroup, mailing list, or Internet forum
 Thread (network protocol), an Internet of Things (IoT) home automation protocol by Thread Group

Other uses
 Thread (non-profit organization), in Baltimore City, US that builds relationships across lines of difference
 Ariadne's thread (logic), a method for solving of a problem with multiple apparent means of proceeding